Korean Australians are Australian citizens who trace their Korean ancestry and identify themselves as an immigrant to or a descendant born in Australia.

History
There is some evidence of the presence of a small number of Koreans in Australia as early as 1920. While it is unclear what prompted their arrival they may have been the children of Australian Protestant missionaries who began work in Korea around 1885. A few also came to Australia between 1921 and 1941 for education.

During World War II (1941–1945), an unknown number of Koreans who had been arrested in Allied countries across the Asia–Pacific Region were transported to Australia and interned alongside Japanese and Formosans for the duration of the war. Most Korean internees carried Japanese names, and were thus difficult to identify.

When the Korean War ended, some Korean women came to Australia as war brides and children as orphans, adopted by Australian families. The relaxation of immigration restrictions in the late 1960s provided the first opportunity for larger numbers of Koreans to enter Australia. In 1969, the first Korean immigrants arrived in Sydney under the Skilled Migration Program. However, there were only 468 Korean born people recorded as living in Australia at the time of the 1971 Census.

In the early 1970s, about 1000 Koreans arrived each year for short-term stays (mostly as students) and around 100 arrived for permanent residence. Some of these new arrivals subsequently sponsored family members for migration. Between 1976 and 1985, around 500 Korea-born immigrants arrived each year resulting in the number of Korea-born living in Australia increasing more than sixfold between the 1976 Census (1460) and the 1986 Census (9290).

From 1986 to 1991, there was a further increase in settler arrivals, with an average of about 1400 each year, many coming under the Skilled and Business migration categories. More than half of the Korea-born in Australia have arrived in the last ten years, including as students.

Historical population

At the 2016 census, 123,017 persons resident in Australia identified themselves as being of Korean ancestry. 98,776 persons resident in Australia had been born in South Korea. At the 2006 census, 59 persons residing in Australia had been born in North Korea.

According to the 2006 census, only 38% declared holding Australian citizenship, 68% had arrived in Australia in 1990 or later, and 63% reside in New South Wales. Few ethnic groups are as concentrated in one state as Koreans are in New South Wales, where 33% of Australia's population live.

At the 2006 Census, 37,426 (71%) Korean-born Australian residents self-identified as Christian, 3,500 (6.6%) as Buddhist, and 9,562 (18%) as having no religious affiliation. Disgruntled former members of Korean Christian churches sometimes join the handful of Korean Buddhist temples in the Sydney area.

Notable people

 Peter Bell, former Australian rules football player who played for Fremantle and the North Melbourne.
 Bang Chan (Christopher Bang), leader of South Korean boy group Stray Kids.
 Yerin Ha, actress
 Yang Hi Choe-Wall, Koreanist and professor of Korean studies.
 Dami Im, winner of the 2013 Australian X Factor and runner-up of the 2016 Eurovision Song Contest.
 Elizabeth Lee, A member of the Australian Capital Territory Legislative Assembly. Currently serving as the Leader of the Opposition in her capacity as Leader of the Canberra Liberals.
 David Kang, barrister who feigned an attack on Prince Charles with a starting pistol in 1994.
 Sky Kim, Olympic archer
 Yvette King, television presenter and entertainment journalist
 Felix Lee, member of South Korean boy group Stray Kids.
 Lee Da-hae, actress
 Leonardo Nam, Korean Argentine actor who emigrated to Australia; born in Buenos Aires.
 Rosé (Roseanne Park), New Zealand born member of the South Korean girl group Blackpink
 Sun Park, former Hi-5 member.
 Jung Ryeo-won, actress and singer active in South Korea. Born in Seoul and raised in Brisbane.
 Dayen Zheng, former Hi-5 member.
 Hanbyul, former member of South Korean boy group Ledapple.
 Kristine Yoon (stage name Hayana), former member of South Korean girl group EvoL.
 Barom Yu, former member of South Korean boy group C-Clown.
 Kevin Kim, former member of South Korean boy group ZE:A.
 Cho Jun Young (Young Sky), member of South Korean R&B/hip hop group One Way.
 Peter Hyun, member of South Korean R&B/hip hop group One Way.
 Hany Lee, actress (Neighbours).
 Ray Ahn, member of Australian rock bands Hard-Ons and Nunchukka Superfly
 Jake (Sim Jae-yun), member of South Korean boy group ENHYPEN. Born in Seoul and raised in Brisbane.
 Danielle, member of South Korean girl group NewJeans.
 Lily, member of South Korean girl group NMIXX.

See also

 Korean New Zealanders
 Strathfield
 Australia–North Korea relations
 Australia–South Korea relations

References

 
Australian, Korean
Immigration to Australia
Asian Australian
Australia–South Korea relations
Korean diaspora in Oceania